The 2018–19 season was the club's first season of play back in the top tier of Scottish football since 2015, having been promoted from the Scottish Championship at the end of the previous season. The club had been relegated from the Premiership at the end of the 2014–15 season. St Mirren will also compete in the League Cup and the Scottish Cup.

Month by month review

April
 30 April – the club announced that Stelios Demetriou, John Sutton, Gary Irvine, Massimo Donati, Josh Todd, Darryl Duffy, Darren Whyte and Nathan Flanagan would leave the club when their contracts expire, while  Lewis Morgan, Mark Hill and Liam Smith would all return to their parent clubs following the expiry of their loans.

May
 2 May – young midfielder Cameron MacPherson signed a six-month contract extension until January 2019, after becoming a regular in the development squad.
 4 May – goalkeeper Craig Samson signed a contract extension, keeping him at the club until the summer of 2020.
 9 May – experienced defender Gary MacKenzie signed a one-year contract extension, tying him to the club until 2019.
 11 May –  defender Harry Davis left the club, after rejecting a new contract offer. The popular Englishman cited family reasons for wanting to move back down South. In total Davis played 31 games for Saints, netting 6 goals.
 14 May –  manager Jack Ross was awarded the Scottish Championship Manager of the Year award for season 2017–18.
 22 May – midfielder Jim Kellerman signed a two-year deal with Saints, after leaving National League side Aldershot Town.
 Also on this day, youth academy player Ben Cameron signed for the club on a two-year development contract.
 25 May – Saints announced that manager Jack Ross and his assistant James Fowler had left the club to become the new management team at Sunderland. The pair signed two-year deals with the League One side.

Also on this day, Saints signed defender Paul McGinn on a two-year deal from relegated Partick Thistle. McGinn is the brother of Saints captain Stephen McGinn, and previously left Saints in 2013 without playing a game for the club.

Also on this day, Saints were drawn against Kilmarnock, Dumbarton, Queen's Park and Spartans in the group stage of the Betfred Cup.

June
 8 June – Alan Stubbs was appointed as the club's new manager, signing a three-year deal.
 21 June – Saints made a double signing, with defender Josh Heaton and forward Cody Cooke joining the club. Highly rated Heaton signed on a three-year-deal from Darlington for a reported fee of £75,000. Cooke signed a two-year contract, and joined from Truro City.
 22 June – midfielder Jeff King signed on a two-year deal from Bolton Wanderers.
 23 June – young midfielder Kyle Magennis signed a one-year extension to his current deal, keeping him contracted to the club until 2021. Also on this day Brian Rice was appointed as the club's new Assistant Manager.

July
 3 July – last season's top scorer Gavin Reilly left the club on a free transfer, signing for Bristol Rovers.
 9 July – Saints signed young left back, Hayden Coulson, on a season-long loan from Middlesbrough.
 11 July – backup goalkeeper Ross Stewart left the club, signing for Livingston on a two-year deal. Saints then moved quickly to sign Aberdeen goalkeeper Danny Rogers on a season-long loan.
 13 July – forward Myles Hippolyte left the club on a free transfer, signing for Dunfermline Athletic on a two-year deal. Hippolyte spent six months with Saints, scoring one goal in eight appearances.
 Also on this day, defender Cole Kpekawa signed a two-year deal after leaving Colchester United.
 27 July – midfielder Matty Willock joined on a season-long loan from Manchester United.

August
 9 August – Danish striker Nicolai Brock-Madsen signed for Saints on a six-month loan from Birmingham City, with an option of a further six months.
 10 August – forward Ross C. Stewart left Saints for an undisclosed fee, signing for Scottish Championship side Ross County. He scored three goals in twenty-one appearances for the club.
 15 August – 20-year old defensive midfielder, Alfie Jones, signed on a season-long loan from Premier League side  Southampton.
 17 August – midfielder Jim Kellerman joined National League side AFC Fylde on a season-long loan, just months after signing a two-year contract with the club. He has made four appearances since joining.
Also on this day, youngster Ethan Erhahon signed a three-year extension with the club.
 20 August – defender Lee Hodson joined the club on a season-long loan from Premiership rivals Rangers.
 31 August – midfielder Ryan Edwards joined on a one-year loan from Heart of Midlothian.

September
 3 September – after less than three months in charge, manager Alan Stubbs was sacked following a poor start to the season.
 7 September – Saints appoint Northern Irishman, Oran Kearney, as the new club manager. The former Coleraine boss signs on a three-year contract.
 10 September – following the sacking of Alan Stubbs, first team coach Darren Jackson also left the club.
 14 September – experienced defender, Anton Ferdinand, signed for the club until the end of the season. Ferdinand most recently played for Southend United, and is Oran Kearney's first signing for the club.
 18 September – former Saints boss, Gus MacPherson, resigned as manager of Queens Park to become the club's new Technical Director.
 21 September – young midfielder, Cammy MacPherson signed a new contract extension – keeping him at the club until the summer of 2020, with a further one-year option.
 27 September – goalkeeper Dean Lyness signed a short term deal until January 2019 as cover for the injured Danny Rogers. Lyness was a free agent after leaving Nuneaton Borough in the summer.
 28 September – Canadian striker Simeon Jackson signed on a short term deal until January 2019. Jackson has played for several English clubs, and most recently left Walsall in the summer. He becomes Oran Kearney's third signing in three weeks.

October
 2 October – Saints signed experienced English midfielder Adam Hammill on a short term deal. After leaving Barnsley in the summer, Hammill agreed to sign with Saints until January 2019.
 16 October – loan signing Nicolai Brock-Madsen returned to Birmingham City before the end of his contract, after an unsuccessful time at the club. The Danish striker played five matches, and failed to find the net.
 17 October – young loanee Hayden Coulson left the club, and returned to Middlesbrough when his stay was cut short. The defender made eleven appearances during his time at the club, scoring once.

November
 2 November – striker Simeon Jackson extended his contract, keeping him at the club until the end of the season.
 9 November – goalkeeper Dean Lyness joined Airdrie on an emergency loan deal. It was then announced that the deal fell through a few days later due to the unexpected retirement of Craig Samson, and Lyness remained with Saints.
 12 November – former Saints striker Junior Mendes joined the club as new Sports Scientist.
 13 November – first choice goalkeeper Craig Samson announced his retirement from playing, and left the club to take up a role as goalkeeping coach at Sunderland. Samson made a total of 162 appearances for the club, over two separate spells in Paisley.
 25 November – Saints were drawn at home to Scottish Championship side Alloa Athletic in the Fourth Round of the Scottish Cup.
 29 November – the club appointed Jimmy Nicholl as new first-team coach.

December
 21 December – midfielder Matty Willock saw his loan deal terminated, and he returned to Manchester United. Willock made 14 appearances for the club.

January
 1 January – Jordan Kirkpatrick left the club and returned to Alloa Athletic, the side he left to join Saints. Kirkpatrick suffered injuries during his time at the club, and made only 20 appearances.
 3 January – two more players left the club, with midfielder Ian McShane joining Falkirk on an 18-month deal, and Adam Hammill joining Scunthorpe United after his short-term deal expired.
 4 January – defender Josh Heaton joined Kidderminster Harriers on loan until the end of the season. Heaton joined in the summer for £75,000, but has failed to break into the first team.
 7 January – Oran Kearney continued to reshape the squad by terminating the loan deals of defender Alfie Jones, and midfielder Ryan Edwards. Jones returns to Southampton having played 15 games for the club, and Edwards returns to Heart of Midlothian after making 14 appearances.
 8 January – midfielder Greg Tansey signed for the club on an 18-month deal, after being released by Aberdeen.
 9 January – goalkeeper Dean Lyness and youth player Connor O'Keefe left the club after their contracts expired. Summer signing Jeff King was also released early from his two-year contract by mutual agreement.
 10 January – Saints signed Romanian defender Mihai Popescu on a six-month loan deal from Dinamo București, with an option to buy the player in the summer.

Also on this day midfielder Cammy Smith joined Dundee United for an undisclosed fee, after stating that he wanted to play first team football, and defender Adam Eckersley joined Scottish League One side Forfar Athletic on loan until the end of the season.

 11 January – Saints signed Czech goalkeeper Václav Hladký from Slovan Liberec on an 18-month deal.
 15 January – midfielder Brad Lyons signed on loan until the end of the season from Blackburn Rovers. The Northern Irish player previously played under Oran Kearney at Coleraine.
 18 January – former Saint, Kyle McAllister, and Australian goalkeeper Jordan Holmes joined the club on loan until the end of the season. McAllister joins from Derby County, while Holmes moves from Bournemouth.

Also on this day, defender Anton Ferdinand extends his contract until the end of the season.

 20 January – Saints were drawn at home to Scottish Championship side Dundee United in the Fifth Round of the Scottish Cup.
 21 January – defender Cole Kpekawa left the club by mutual consent, having only played eight matches since signing in the summer.
 23 January – the club successfully appealed the second yellow card that Brad Lyons picked up in the recent Scottish Cup win over Alloa Athletic, meaning that he will be available for the next round match against Dundee United.
 26 January – Saints recruited two more players, signing Danish winger Anders Dreyer on loan until the end of the season from Brighton & Hove Albion and Croat defender Mateo Mužek from Shakhter Karagandy.
 31 January – assistant manager Brian Rice left the club, to take over as manager at Hamilton Academical.

Also on this day the club signed Haitian striker Duckens Nazon from Belgian side Sint-Truiden and Romanian defender Laurențiu Corbu from Dinamo Bucureșt, both on loans until the end of the season.

February
 1 February – defender Jack Baird signed a two-year contract extension, keeping him tied to the club until 2021.
 5 February – young forward Cameron Breadner joined Scottish League One side Stenhousemuir on loan until the end of the season.
 12 February – Adam Eckersley signed a pre-contract with Forfar Athletic, who he is currently on loan with until the end of the season. Eckersley's Saints career is effectively over, having made 42 appearances and scoring once.
 26 February – 19-year old striker Sam Jamieson joins struggling Brechin City on loan with until the end of the season.

March
 18 March – loanee Kyle McAllister earned his first Scotland Under-21 call up for the upcoming matches against Mexico Under-21 and Sweden national Under-21 .

April
 13 April – midfielder Greg Tansey revealed that his playing career could be over, after contracting osteomyelitis .

May
 2 May – Danish midfielder Anders Dreyer returned to Brighton & Hove Albion and missed the end of the season, after picking up a knee injury. Dreyer scored one goal in his eleven appearances for the club.

Squad list

Results & fixtures

Pre season / Friendlies

Scottish Premiership

Premiership play-offs

Scottish League Cup

Matches

Scottish Cup

Player statistics

Appearances and goals

|-
|colspan="14"|Players who left the club during the season:
|-

|-
|}

Goal scorers

Disciplinary record
Includes all competitive matches.
Last updated 26 May 2019

Team statistics

League Cup table

League table

Division summary

League results by opponent

Management statistics
Last updated on 26 May 2019

Transfers

Players in

Players out

See also
List of St Mirren F.C. seasons

Notes

References

St Mirren F.C. seasons
St Mirren